Realf Ottesen Brandt (September 12, 1859 – March 23, 1927) was an American Lutheran minister.

Background
Realf  Brandt was born near the Jefferson Prairie Settlement in Rock County, Wisconsin. His father, Nils Olsen Brandt (1824–1921), who had been born Slidre, Valdres, Norway, served as  President of Luther College. His mother, Diderikke Ottesen Brandt (1827–1885), was born in Sande parish on the Oslofjord in Norway. In appreciation of her many contributions to Luther College, the alumni association in 1883 had her portrait painted by Herbjørn Gausta. Realf Brandt was a graduate of Luther College in 1877 and of Luther Seminary at Madison, Wisconsin in 1883.

Ministry
He was ordained a Lutheran minister on September 2, 1883, by the Reverend U. V. Koren. He served in the Lutheran ministry for 44 years. He served for 17 years in Deuel County, South Dakota and for 27 years at McFarland, Wisconsin. Both Brandt Township in Deuel County and the village of Brandt, South Dakota were named for him.

Starting in 1906 and working with Halvor Hustvedt, Brandt was one of the first editors of Lutheran Herald. This was the first general church organ published in English by a Norwegian-American synodical body. Brandt was a member of the South Dakota Board of Regents from 1890 until 1892. He also proved himself a leader of the movement to outlaw liquor in the state of South Dakota.

Realf Brandt married Thalette "Lettie" Mathilde Galby (1859–1939) in 1880. The daughter of John T. Galby and Margaret Aaker of Ridgeway, Iowa, Lettie was educated at the Breckenridge Institute in Decorah. She served as officer in several Lutheran church organizations, including two terms as secretary of the Eastern District Women's Missionary Federation.

References

Other sources
Lomen, G. J. Genealogies of the Lomen (Ringstad), Brandt and Joy's Families (Northfield, Minnesota: Mohn Printing Company, 1929)

External links
Brandt Hall at Luther College
Luther College Brandt Family Papers
Diderikke Sofie Mariane Benedicte (Ottesen) Brandt by Herbjørn Gausta, (1883)

19th-century American Lutheran clergy
American people of Norwegian descent
1859 births
1927 deaths
People from Deuel County, South Dakota
People from McFarland, Wisconsin
Luther College (Iowa) alumni
People from Clinton, Rock County, Wisconsin
20th-century American Lutheran clergy